Custer Township is the name of some places in the U.S. state of Michigan:

 Custer Township, Antrim County, Michigan
 Custer Township, Mason County, Michigan
 Custer Township, Sanilac County, Michigan

See also
 Custer, Michigan, a village in Mason County
Custer Township (disambiguation)

Michigan township disambiguation pages